Salim Khelifi (born 26 January 1994) is a professional footballer who plays as a midfielder for Perth Glory in the A-League Men. Born in Switzerland, he was a youth international for Switzerland before representing the Tunisia national team.

Club career
Khelifi made his professional debut on 6 August 2012 for Lausanne-Sport against Servette in a Swiss Super League match. He scored his first league goal for the club on 17 November 2012 in a 3–0 home win against Thun.

In January 2014 Khelifi joined Eintracht Braunschweig, who played in the Bundesliga at the time. He made his debut in the Bundesliga on 3 May 2014, replacing Karim Bellarabi in the 88th minute of Braunschweig's home game against FC Augsburg.

On 21 June 2018, Khelifi signed a three-year contract with Swiss side FC Zürich.

On 23 August 2019, Khelifi joined Holstein Kiel on a season-long loan deal with an option to make the deal permanent.

On 21 May 2022, Zürich announced that Khelifi's contract will not be extended.

In September 2022, Khelifi joined Australian A-League Men club Perth Glory on a one-year contract. In December 2022, his contract was extended for another two seasons.

International career
Khelifi debuted for the Tunisia national team in a 1–0 friendly win over Mauritania on 6 September 2019.

References

External links
 
 

1994 births
Living people
People from Winterthur
Swiss people of Tunisian descent
Sportspeople from the canton of Zürich
Tunisian footballers
Swiss men's footballers
Association football midfielders
Tunisia international footballers
Switzerland under-21 international footballers
Switzerland youth international footballers
Swiss Super League players
Bundesliga players
2. Bundesliga players
FC Lausanne-Sport players
Eintracht Braunschweig players
Eintracht Braunschweig II players
FC Zürich players
Holstein Kiel players
Perth Glory FC players
Swiss expatriate footballers
Swiss expatriate sportspeople in Germany
Expatriate footballers in Germany
Swiss expatriate sportspeople in Australia
Expatriate soccer players in Australia
Swiss Promotion League players